Nandrolone cyclotate (developmental code name RS-3268R), or nandrolone ciclotate, also known as 19-nortestosterone 17β-ciclotate, is a synthetic and injected anabolic–androgenic steroid (AAS) of the nandrolone (19-nortestosterone) group which was never marketed. It is an androgen ester – specifically, the C17β ciclotate (4-methylbicyclo[2.2.2]oct-2-ene-1-carboxylate) ester of nandrolone. Nandrolone cyclotate has potent and prolonged activity as an AAS when administered by intramuscular injection and is reported to have a similar duration of action to that of nandrolone decanoate via this route.

See also 
 List of androgen esters § Nandrolone esters

References 

Abandoned drugs
Androgens and anabolic steroids
Nandrolone esters
Progestogens